Habanos S.A. is a Cuban manufacturing company of tobacco that controls the promotion, distribution, and export of premium cigars and other tobacco products for Cuba worldwide. It was established in 1994.

Ownership of Habanos S.A. is split equally between state-owned Cubatabaco and privately held Spanish-based tobacco giant Altadis. The company commercialises the brands Cohiba, Montecristo, Bolívar_(cigar_brand), and Romeo y Julieta, amongst others.

Overview
The word  (not normally capitalised) means literally (something) from Havana, and is the word used in the Spanish-speaking world for Havana cigars and, sometimes, cigars in general. Habanos S.A. owns the trademarks of every brand of Cuban-made cigars and cigarettes in the countries they are exported to and franchises the  chain of cigar stores. To control distribution and protect against counterfeiting, Habanos S.A. exports to only one company in each country (Hunters & Frankau for Great Britain and Gibraltar, 5th Avenue Cigars for Germany, Intertabak for Switzerland, Pacific Cigar Co. for most of the Pacific Rim, etc.). The only nation to which Habanos S.A. doesn't sell cigars is the United States, which has had a trade embargo against Cuba since 1962. 

In 2000, the Franco-Spanish tobacco giant Altadis purchased 50% of Habanos S.A. There has been speculation that their influence has led to Habanos' drastic restructuring of their cigar lines and size offerings, the adoption of marketing practices and production methods more in-line with cigar companies that market in the US, and the increasing number of "special release" and "limited edition" lines of cigars.  It has also been suggested that Altadis might be ramping Habanos up ready to trade with the US, anticipating the end of the embargo. On the other hand, some observers have noted a restoration of Cuban cigar quality, which had declined dramatically in the 1990s after the fall of the Soviet Union. Altadis was acquired by Imperial Tobacco in February 2008.

In May 2019, Imperial Tobacco announced their intention to sell their premium cigar division, including their share in Habanos S.A. One year later, Imperial Brands announced the sale of Habanos S.A. through two different transactions for a total of €1,225 million. The first operation include the selling of the U.S.-based business, "Premium Cigar USA" to Gemstone Investment Holding Ltd., while in the second operation, Allied Cigar Corp. will acquire Imperial Brands' cigar business in the rest of the world, "Premium Cigar RoW".

See also 
 Vuelta Abajo
 List of cigar brands

References

External links

 

Habanos S.A. brands
Tobacco companies of Cuba
Cuban brands
Imperial Brands
Companies established in 1994